Copșa Mică is a town in Sibiu County, Transylvania, Romania, located north of Sibiu, 33 km east of Blaj, and 12 km southwest of Mediaș. The town's population of 5,201 (as of 2011) is significantly lower compared to its previous level in 1989, the year communism collapsed in Romania. At the 2011 census, 78.8% of inhabitants were Romanians, 11.9% Roma, and 8.7% Hungarians.

Pollution 

The town is best known for its status (dating to the 1990s) as one of the most polluted in Europe. This was due to the emissions of two factories in the area:

 One, open from 1935 to 1993, produced carbon black for dyes; its emissions permeated the area for nearly sixty years, leaving soot on homes, trees, animals, and everything else in the area. The stain from these decades of deposits are still visible.
 The other source of the pollution, less visible but with even more serious effects to the health of the town's residents, was Sometra, a smelter whose emissions have contributed to significantly higher incidence of lung disease and impotence, along with a life expectancy nine years below Romania's average.

Administration and local politics

Town council 

The town's current local council has the following political composition, according to the results of the 2020 Romanian local elections:

Natives 

 Dan Tăpălagă, journalist

References

External links 

 Town's official website (in Romanian)
 1993 project funded by UNIDO to assist in the establishment of cleaner production practices at Sometra
 Satellite photos of Copșa Mică in 1986 and 2004
 fragilecologies.com: The People and Pollution of Copșa Mică, Romania
 Copșa Mică's Past and Future: Can Europe's Most Polluted Town Go Green?

Towns in Romania
Populated places in Sibiu County
Localities in Transylvania
Monotowns in Romania